A rape fantasy (sometimes referred to as rapeplay) or a ravishment is a sexual fantasy involving imagining or pretending being coerced or coercing another into sexual activity. In sexual roleplay, it involves acting out roles of coercive sex. Rape pornography is literature or images associated with rape and sometimes Stockholm syndrome as a means of sexual arousal.

Fantasy 
Studies have found rape fantasy is a common sexual fantasy among both men and women. The fantasy may involve the fantasist as either the one being forced into sex or being the perpetrator. One study found that being "overpowered or forced to surrender" was the second-most frequent fantasy in their survey.
Another study found that over half of their female respondents have had a fantasy of forced sex in their life. 

The most frequently cited hypothesis for why women fantasize of being forced and coerced into some sexual activity is that the fantasy avoids societally induced guilt—the woman does not have to admit responsibility for her sexual desires and behavior. A 1978 study by Moreault and Follingstad was consistent with this hypothesis, and found that women with high levels of sex guilt were more likely to report fantasy themed around being overpowered, dominated, and helpless. In contrast, Pelletier and Herold used a different measure of guilt and found no correlation. Other research suggests that women who report forced sex fantasies have a more positive attitude towards sexuality, contradicting the guilt hypothesis. A newer study from 1998 by Strassberg and Locker found that women who fantasized about force were generally less guilty and more erotophilic, and as a result had more frequent and varied fantasies. However, it said that force fantasies are not the most common or the most frequent.

A male sexual fantasy of raping a woman may bring sexual arousal either from imagining a scene in which first a woman objects but then comes to like and eventually participate in the intercourse, or else one in which the woman does not like it and arousal is associated with the idea of hurting the woman.

Prevalence among genders 

Numerous studies have found that fantasies about being forced to have sex are commonly found across all genders. 45.8% of men in a 1980 study reported fantasizing during heterosexual intercourse about "a scene where [they had] the impression of being raped by a woman" (3.2% often and 42.6% sometimes), 44.7% of scenes where a seduced woman "pretends resisting" and 33% of raping a woman.

A study of college-age women in 1998 found over half had engaged in fantasies of rape or coercion which, another study suggests, are simply "open and unrestricted" expressions of female sexuality.

In a more recent study among more than 4,000 Americans, 61% of respondents who identify as women had fantasized about being forced to have sex; meanwhile, the numbers were 54% among men.

Roleplay 

One form of sexual roleplaying is the rape fantasy, also called ravishment or forced sex roleplay. In BDSM circles (and occasionally outside these circles as well), some people choose to roleplay rape scenes—with communication, consent and safety being especially crucial elements. Though consent is a crucial component of any sexual roleplay, the illusion of non-consent (i.e. rape) is important to maintaining this type of fantasy. A safe word is therefore a common safety measure, given that words that would normally halt sexual activity (e.g. "stop") are often disregarded in these scenes. Continuing with the sexual roleplay after a safeword has been used constitutes rape, as the use of a safeword indicates the withdrawal of consent.

See also
Forced seduction

References

Further reading 
Desmond Ravenstone (2005). Ravishment: The Dark Side of Erotic Fantasy. .
Desmond Ravenstone, "Ravishment 101"

Sexual emotions
Sexual roleplay
Rape
Sexual fantasies